The John Deere Model L tractor was a small one-plow row-crop tractor produced by John Deere from 1937 to 1946.

Description and production
The L was first produced in 1937. Unlike most John Deere tractors, it was designed in John Deere's Dubuque Wagon Works plant in Dubuque, Iowa, and did not resemble previous Deere products. It departed further from tradition by using a non-Deere engine, a Hercules two-cylinder engine mounted in line, rather than transversely, as had been traditional, mated to a three-speed Ford transmission, with the engine mounted far forward over the wide-set front wheels. This created a distinctive empty gap between the engine and operator. Late 1938 models were restyled in line with other Deere tractors, with Henry Dreyfuss cowlings and grilles. In 1940. the  LA was introduced, using a John Deere engine, and the L received a Deere engine in lieu of the Hercules. The LA introduced a power take-off to the L line. Both the L and LA were produced at the same time. Ls and LAs used only gasoline as fuel. Production ended in 1946.

Variants
A high-clearance version was available. Special plowing, mowing and cultivating accessories were produced for the L tractors. A lower and wider industrial version, the LI, was introduced in 1941, usually employed as a mower.

References

External links
 Test 313: John Deere L at the Nebraska Tractor Test Laboratory (NTTL)
 Test 373: John Deere LA at the NTTL

John Deere tractors